Bekal Airport is a proposed airport to be constructed at Periya, near Bekal, Kerala.

History
In 2016, the Government of Kerala has appointed Cochin International Airport Limited to undertake the Bekal Airstrip project.

Under the UDAN 4 scheme, the Ministry of Civil Aviation (India) gave preliminary approval to the Bekal Airstrip project in 2019. The airport would spread across 80 acres of land at Kanniyamkundu, 7 km from Periya.

Airports Authority of India will develop the infrastructure and operate the airport.

References

Airports in Kerala